The Tour de Suisse is an annual road cycling stage race. Raced over eight days, the event covers two weekends in June, and along with the Critérium du Dauphiné, it is considered a proving ground for the Tour de France, which is on the calendar approximately two weeks after the end of the Tour de Suisse. Since 2011 the event is part of the UCI World Tour, cycling's highest level of professional races.

History 
The race was first held in 1933 and has evolved in timing, duration and sponsorship. Like the Tour de France and the Dauphiné, the Tour de Suisse has several stages with significant mountain climbs in the Swiss Alps and at least one individual time trial. Several winners of the Tour de Suisse have also won the Tour de France, including Eddy Merckx and Jan Ullrich. In 2005 the Tour de Suisse was included in the inaugural UCI Pro Tour and organizers moved the race to earlier in June.

The first winner of the race was Austrian Max Bulla in the 1933 edition. The rider with most wins is Italian Pasquale Fornara with 4 wins in the 1950s. The most recent winner is Geraint Thomas, who won for the first time in 2022.

Winners

Multiple winners

By country

See also 
 List of highest paved roads in Switzerland

Notes

References

Sources

External links 
 
 

 
UCI ProTour races
Cycle races in Switzerland
Recurring sporting events established in 1933
1933 establishments in Switzerland
UCI World Tour races
Annual sporting events in Switzerland
Summer events in Switzerland
Challenge Desgrange-Colombo races
Super Prestige Pernod races